At First Light is an Irish Celtic music group. At First Light comprises Uilleann Piper John McSherry, fiddle player Dónal O'Connor and Francis McIlduff.

Members
[John McSherry (Uilleann Pipes, Low whistles)
Dónal O'Connor (Fiddle, Keyboards)
Francis McIlduff (Uilleann Pipes, Whistles, Bodhran)

Discography
 2012: Idir

External links
At First Light Website

References

Irish folk musical groups